Nicola Lavery (born 19 November 1960) is a British cross-country skier. She competed in four events at the 1984 Winter Olympics.

She is also a fell runner, having completed a winter Bob Graham Round and won the Wasdale, Ennerdale and Three Shires races.

References

External links
 

1960 births
Living people
British female cross-country skiers
Olympic cross-country skiers of Great Britain
Cross-country skiers at the 1984 Winter Olympics
British fell runners
Sportspeople from Middlesbrough